The K1810VM86 is a Soviet 16-bit microprocessor, a clone of the Intel 8086 CPU with which it is binary and pin compatible. It was developed between 1982 and 1985. The original K1810VM86 supported a clock frequency of up to 5 MHz while up to 8 MHz were allowed for the later K1810VM86M (К1810ВМ86M; corresponding to Intel 8086-2). The K1810VM86 was manufactured plastic 40-pin dual in-line package (as KR1810VM86 / КР1810ВМ86) or in a 40-pin ceramic dual in-line package (as KM1810VM86 / КМ1810ВМ86 for the commercial version or M1810VM86 / М1810ВМ86 for the military version). A clone of the related Intel 8088 with its 8-bit bus was manufactured as the K1810VM88, also in plastic and ceramic packages.

Technology and support chips 

The K1810VM86 was manufactured with an n-MOS process.

The family consists of the following chips:

For brevity, the table above lists only the chip variants in a plastic DIP (prefix КР). Not listed separately are variants in a ceramic DIP (prefix КМ for commercial version and prefix М for the military version).

Additionally, many devices in the K580 series could be used for the K1810 series as well.

Applications
Unlike the earlier KR580VM80A which was very popular in the Soviet Union but little used elsewhere, the K1810VM86 was widely used throughout the Eastern Bloc due to it being one of the first 16-bit microprocessors available there and among those the only one with an x86 instruction set, allowing it to run MS-DOS. Examples for personal computers built based on the K1810VM86 (or the 8-bit bus variant K1810VM88) are:
 Iskra-502, Iskra-1030, Iskra-1130, Poisk in the Soviet Union
 Mazovia 1016 in Poland
 PP 01.16 in Czechoslovakia
 A7100, A7150, EC1834 in East Germany

Further development
CMOS versions equivalent to the Intel 80C86 were named KR1834VM86 (КР1834ВМ86; developed in Kyiv in 1989 / 1990 and then manufactured in Minsk) and KR1835VM86 (КР1835ВМ86). The original KR1810VM86 is still shown on the price list of 15 August 2022 of the "Kvazar" plant in Kyiv together with various support chips of the K580 and K1810 series, while the newer CMOS versions appear to be no longer in production.

A clone of the Intel 80C286 was manufactured under the name KR1847VM286 (КР1847ВМ286) but apparently did not see widespread use.

No other processors with an x86 instruction set were designed in the Soviet Union until much later the 1875VD1T (1875ВД1Т, equivalent to the Intel 80C186) and 1875VD2T (1875ВД2Т, equivalent to the Intel 80386EXTB).

See also
 Intel 8086
 Soviet integrated circuit designation

References

X86 microprocessors
Computing in the Soviet Union
16-bit microprocessors